Azim Surani  (born 1945 in Kisumu, Kenya) is a Kenyan-British developmental biologist who has been Marshall–Walton Professor at the Wellcome Trust/Cancer Research UK Gurdon Institute at the University of Cambridge since 1992, and Director of Germline and Epigenomics Research since 2013.

Education
Surani was educated at Plymouth University (BSc), the University of Strathclyde (MSc) and the University of Cambridge (PhD) where his research was supervised by Robert Edwards, who later won the Nobel Prize in Physiology or Medicine.

Career and research
Surani co-discovered mammalian genomic imprinting with Davor Solter in 1984, and subsequently examined its mechanism and the functions of imprinted genes. He later established the genetic basis for germ cell specification, using a single-cell analysis in mice. This genetic network also initiates the unique resetting of the germline epigenome, including comprehensive erasure of DNA methylation towards re-establishing full genomic potency. Epigenetic modifications and re-establishments of imprints then generate functional differences between parental genomes whilst aberrant imprints contribute to human disease.

Surani's research is identifying key regulators of human germ line development and epigenome reprogramming, revealing differences between humans and mice attributable to their divergent pluripotent states and early postimplantation development. He is also investigating transposable elements, host defence mechanisms, noncoding RNAs, and the potential for transgenerational epigenetic inheritance in mammals.

Awards and honours
Surani has received several awards for his work including the Royal Medal (2010), the Gabor Medal (2001) and the Mendel Lectures (2010). He received the Canada Gairdner International Award, with Davor Solter, "For the discovery of mammalian genomic imprinting that causes parent-of-origin specific gene expression and its consequences for development and disease." He won the Rosenstiel Award in 2006, with Solter and Mary Lyon, for "pioneering work on epigenetic gene regulation in mammalian embryos".

External links
 Interviewed by Alan Macfarlane 19 June 2009  (video)

References

Living people
Commanders of the Order of the British Empire
Fellows of the Royal Society
Fellows of the Academy of Medical Sciences (United Kingdom)
British Ismailis
1945 births
Fellows of King's College, Cambridge
Alumni_of_the_University_of_Plymouth